Barachois Brook  is a local service district and designated place in the Canadian province of Newfoundland and Labrador. It is on the western coast of the province, on Bay St. George, located just 5 km south of Stephenville Crossing.

"Black Bank", a popular beach, is located in Barachois Brook.

The post office was established there in 1963. The first Postmaster was Churchill J. Messervey.

It had an estimated population of 120 in 2021.

Barachois Brook once had a RCMP detachment which is no longer in use. The building, located just outside of St. George's on the outer edge of the community, is now used by the provincial government as a Forestry Resource office.

Geography 
Barachois Brook is in Newfoundland within Subdivision C of Division No. 4.

Demographics 

Government 
Barachois Brook is a local service district (LSD) that is governed by a committee responsible for the provision of certain services to the community. The chair of the LSD committee is Gerard Lee.

See also 
List of communities in Newfoundland and Labrador
List of designated places in Newfoundland and Labrador
List of local service districts in Newfoundland and Labrador

References 

Designated places in Newfoundland and Labrador
Local service districts in Newfoundland and Labrador